Henriette Confurius (born 5 February 1991) is a German actress known to international audiences for her role in the Netflix sci-fi television series Tribes of Europa.

Life and career
Henriette Confurius' father is German-Dutch writer Gerrit Confurius, her mother is a Dutch theatre actress, and she has two brothers, Lucas and Carl, who are also actors. She did not study acting and moved around during her youth. She studied hand-skilled trades but says "I always went back to acting sooner or later".

She is noted for her role as Kayla in the film The Countess. In Wir sind wieder wer, she played a young German woman who falls in love with a member of the American occupying force (Jerry Hoffmann). The film received the 2012 No Fear Award at the First Steps Awards. Confurius played the main role of Charlotte von Lengefeld in the 2014 film Beloved Sisters.

In 2021, she was cast as the lead in the Netflix series Tribes of Europa.

Selected filmography

References

External links
 

1991 births
Living people
German film actresses
German people of Dutch descent
German television actresses
German child actresses
21st-century German actresses